New Land Magazine (新天地雜誌) is an Australian Chinese-English bilingual magazine currently headquartered in Sydney. The magazine was established in 2004. Its aim is to bridge the Chinese and Australian cultures together, and to provide a gateway for the Asian community into the Australian lifestyle, culture and customs. The content emphasizes real-life stories, and coverage of fashion, food and travel destinations.

References

External links
 Official website

2004 establishments in Australia
Lifestyle magazines published in Australia
Chinese-Australian culture in Sydney
Chinese-language magazines
Cultural magazines
English-Chinese bilingual magazines
Magazines established in 2004
Magazines published in Sydney
Ethnic mass media in Australia